The 1988 Louisville Cardinals football team represented the University of Louisville in the 1988 NCAA Division I-A football season. The Cardinals, led by fourth-year head coach Howard Schnellenberger, participated as independents and played their home games at Cardinal Stadium.

Schedule

Roster

References

Louisville
Louisville Cardinals football seasons
Louisville Cardinals football